Fred Schell is a Canadian politician, who was elected as the Member of the Legislative Assembly for the electoral district of South Baffin in the Legislative Assembly of Nunavut at a by-election following the 2008 territorial election. The by-election was called as no candidate came forward during the general election. Prior to election as an MLA, Schell served as mayor of Cape Dorset.

Schell was the minister responsible for the Nunavut Housing Corp. and the Workers' Safety and Compensation Commission, and the minister responsible for homelessness.  Nunavut Premier Eva Aariak removed all his ministerial portfolios effective March 11, 2012.  Aariak did not give any specific reasons for removing Schell's portfolios, which were reassigned to other cabinet ministers.

References

External links
. Biography at the Legislative Assembly of Nunavut

1952 births
Living people
Members of the Legislative Assembly of Nunavut
21st-century Canadian politicians
Mayors of places in Nunavut
People from Kinngait
Politicians from Winnipeg